The men's flyweight 52 kg boxing event at the 2019 European Games in Minsk was held from 23 to 29 June at the Uruchie Sports Palace.

Results

References

External links
Draw Sheet

Men 52